The Life of Jimmy Dolan, released in the UK as The Kid's Last Fight, is a 1933 American pre-Code film starring Douglas Fairbanks Jr. and Loretta Young. John Wayne has a small supporting role as a frightened boxer. The story was based on a 1933 play called "Sucker" by Bertram Millhauser. The film was remade in 1939 as They Made Me a Criminal.

Plot
Southpaw boxer Jimmy Dolan claims that he believes in clean living outside the ring, but is a cynic when no one's looking. Blonde vixen Goldie West gets him drunk after a fight. Then when reporter Magee plans to write about Jimmy's behavior, a punch in the face accidentally kills Magee.

With the fighter certain to face charges and possible incarceration, his manager Doc Woods makes off with Jimmy's money and watch. Driving away with Goldie, they end up in a fiery car crash and are killed. Doc's face is unrecognizable, and because he's wearing Jimmy's watch, it is believed the boxer is dead.

A detective, Phlaxer, is unconvinced. The watch is on the wrong wrist for a left-hander. Jimmy, trying to take advantage of the situation and begin a new life, disappears. On the verge of starvation, he comes across a farm run for crippled children by a young woman named Peggy and her aunt. He helps them with the kids as thanks for their hospitality.

A charity match against boxer King Cobra is arranged to raise badly needed money for the farm's mortgage. A photograph of Dolan under the assumed name of Jack Daugherty makes it obvious to Phlaxer that fugitive Jimmy Dolan is very much alive. He intends to take him into custody, but upon seeing how Jimmy's life has changed for the better, the detective lets him remain free.

Cast
 Douglas Fairbanks Jr. as Jimmy Dolan
 Loretta Young as Peggy
 Aline MacMahon as Auntie (Mrs. Moore)
 Guy Kibbee as Phlaxer
 Lyle Talbot as Doc Woods
 Fifi D'Orsay as Budgie 
 Harold Huber as Reggie Newman
 Shirley Grey as Goldie West (uncredited)
 George Meeker as Charles Magee (uncredited)
 John Wayne as Boxer 
 Arthur Hohl as Herman Malvin  (uncredited)
 Mickey Rooney as Freckles (uncredited)
 George Chandler as Boxing Handler
 Allen Hoskins as Sam (uncredited)

See also
 John Wayne filmography

References

External links
 
 
 

1933 films
1933 drama films
American drama films
American black-and-white films
American boxing films
Films directed by Archie Mayo
Warner Bros. films
1930s English-language films
1930s American films
Films about disability